Cláudio Márcio de Souza Santos, better known by his stage name Speedfreaks or simply Speed, was a Brazilian rapper, composer, musician, and member of the Underground Hip Hop duo Black Alien & Speed. He was considered to be a pioneer in the Brazilian Underground Hip Hop genre. Like most rappers of the genre, his lyrics talked about the reality of the Brazilian streets, dealing with crime, poverty, prejudice in general, drugs and money.

According to Isto É magazine, Speedfreaks created "one of the best rap records of recent times". Unfortunately, he died, murdered on March 26, 2010.

Career
Speedfreaks initiated his career in 1989, in the city of Niterói, in the state of Rio de Janeiro. He started performing with Rap freestyles, and at local shows usually as a featured guest. He wrote his first rap song, Sinistro, in the early 1990s, while his second song was Eu Sou o Capeta.

In 1993, he released his demotape called Speedfreaks, with former musical partner Gustavo Black Alien. During the same year, he participated in the compilation album No Major Babies, with the song Hit Hard Hip Hop released in Brazil, Europe and the United States. He was also featured in Planet Hemp's album Usuário.

In 1996, he released his first solo album called De Macaco on an independent label.

From 1997 to 1998, he released several songs on websites such as Som da Glock and Timoneiro. In 1999, along with Gustavo Black Alien, he formed the Hip Hop duo Black Alien & Speed, which debuted with the song Guerrilha Verbal. Speedfreaks also has a feature on Marcelo D2's first solo album, Eu Tiro é Onda, specifically in the song Império Contra Ataca.

In 2000, he recorded the album Na Face with São Paulo producer Carlo Bartollini, released independently on the internet. He recorded with Fernanda Abreu the song O Som do Sim, which was on Herbert Vianna's album. That same year, he was featured on the albums Tributo a Luiz Gonzaga and Baião de Vira Mundo.

In 2001, Speed released his album called Expresso, which featured Rappin' Hood and Otto. Along with Black Alien, he released one of the duo's greatest hit songs: Quem que Caguetou?, which was also released in Europe. It received remixes from Afrika Bambaataa and Fat Boy Slim, and was re-recorded in the United States under the title Follow Me, Follow Me.

In 2003, he released the instrumental album Sangue Sob o Sol. Still in 2003, after various discussions with Black Alien, the duo ended. In 2006, he also released the album Só o Beginço, which featured Rhossi, from Pavilhão 9.

In 2008, Speedfreaks released a new project called Meu Nome é Velocidade, which featured singer BNegão in the song Você Morreu. The following year, he released De Volta no Jogo, through his independent label, Speed's Hits. He was about to release Remixxx-Speedfreaks Features, which was a compilation of songs with special appearances by Speed. He also recorded the song Trocando Ideia with the fellow Carioca rapper Tigrão Big Tiger, which was part of the album De Volta no Jogo.

A documentary film about the life of rapper Speedfreaks is scheduled to be released in 2020.

Death
Speedfreaks was found dead on March 26, 2010, in the neighborhood of São Lourenço, Niterói, Rio de Janeiro. According to local police, the bodies of Speed and one more person were found, with gunshot wounds, inside a ditch on Capitão Evangelista street. The case was treated as a double homicide. Furthermore, investigators also stated that he may have been killed by drug dealers, who could have mistaken him for a police officer.

Discography

Albums
 Expresso (2001)
 Sangue Sob o Sol (2003)
 Só o Começo (2006)
 Meu Nome é Velocidade (2008)
 De Volta No Jogo (2009)
 Remixxx-Speedfreaks Featurings Vol. 1 (2009)

Video Clips
 2008 – São Gonçalo/Niterói (with Tigrão Big Tiger)
 2009 – Trocando Ideia (with Tigrão Big Tiger)
 2010 – Follow Me, Follow Me (with Black Alien)

References

Brazilian rappers
Musicians from Rio de Janeiro (city)
1973 births
2010 deaths